William Sedley (c1509-1553) was an English landowner and administrator from Kent who lived at Scadbury in the parish of Southfleet and served as Sheriff of the county in 1547.

References

People from Kent
High Sheriffs of Kent
16th-century English people